Golden Gator may refer to:
KhLΘG, a fictional character from Marvel Comics
Golden Gator, the nickname for the probable former pet alligator captured at Mountain Lake Park in San Francisco in 1996